The 1983 Tour de Romandie was the 37th edition of the Tour de Romandie cycle race and was held from 3 May to 8 May 1983. The race started in Bulle and finished in Vernier. The race was won by Stephen Roche of the Peugeot team.

General classification

References

1983
Tour de Romandie
1983 Super Prestige Pernod